Melting the Venusberg: A Feminist Theology of Music is a 2004 book by Heidi Epstein, in which the author provides a critique of the foundations of the understanding of Western music. She argues that this understanding has reinforced social prejudices, particularly those against women and this is more evident in religious music.

References

External links
Melting the Venusberg: A Feminist Theology of Music

2004 non-fiction books
Continuum International Publishing Group books
Christian theology books
Music books